Roger Grey, 1st Baron Grey of Ruthin (c. 1298 – 6 March 1353) was summoned to parliament in 1324. He saw much service as a soldier.

Roger was the son of John Grey, 2nd Baron Grey de Wilton and Maud de Verdon. He married Elizabeth daughter of John Hastings, 1st Baron Hastings of Bergavenny, by whom he had a son who succeeded as Reginald Grey, 2nd Baron Grey de Ruthyn.

His daughter, Mary, married Sir William d'Isney, High Sheriff of Lincolnshire (1340), Knight of the Shire in Parliament (1343).

Bibliography

 Douglas Richardson, Magna Carta Ancestry, 2nd Edition, Vol. I, p. 573.
 Douglas Richardson, Magna Carta Ancestry, 2nd Edition, Vol. II, pp. 181–182, 271–272.
 Douglas Richardson, Magna Carta Ancestry, 2nd Edition, Vol. III, pp. 329, 432.
 Douglas Richardson, Magna Carta Ancestry, 2nd Edition, Vol. IV, pp. 341–342.
 Douglas Richardson, Plantagenet Ancestry, pp. 607, 620, 764–765.
 Douglas Richardson, Plantagenet Ancestry: 2nd Edition, Vol. III, p. 100.
 Douglas Richardson, Royal Ancestry, Vol. II, p. 258.
 Douglas Richardson, Royal Ancestry, Vol. III, pp. 123–124, 257, 442–443.
 Douglas Richardson, Royal Ancestry, Vol. IV, pp. 313, 470.
 Douglas Richardson, Royal Ancestry, Vol. V, pp. 367–368.
 George Edward Cokayne, The Complete Peerage, Vol. VI, pp. 151–153.
 Burke's Peerage, p. 1162.
 Ronny O. Bodine, The Ancestry of Dorothea Poyntz, p. 119.

1353 deaths
14th-century English people
Ruthyn, Reginald Grey, 1st Baron Grey de
Year of birth uncertain
Barons Grey of Ruthin
Younger sons of barons